The FICE code is a six-digit identification code used to identify institutions of higher education in the United States.  It was initially used to identify schools doing business with the Office of Education during the early sixties.  It is named after the Federal Interagency Committee on Education.

This code is no longer used in federal data sets such as the Integrated Postsecondary Education Data System, having been replaced by the Office of Postsecondary Education (OPE) code.  It is still used by some state governments, such as Texas.

References

External links 
 List of FICE codes
Higher education in the United States
Unique identifiers